The 1889 Iowa gubernatorial election was held on November 5, 1889. Democratic nominee Horace Boies defeated Republican nominee Joseph Hutchinson with 49.90% of the vote.

General election

Candidates
Major party candidates
Horace Boies, Democratic 
Joseph Hutchinson, Republican

Other candidates
S. B. Downing, Union Labor
Malcolm Smith, Prohibition

Results

References

1889
Iowa